The 2018 ICF Canoe Marathon World Championships took place between 6 and 9 September 2018 at Vila Verde, Portugal. The competition consisted of sixteen events – ten in kayak and six in canoe – shared between junior, under-23 and senior categories.

Medalists

Seniors

Under 23

Juniors

Medal table

References

External links
 ICF site
 Results site

ICF Canoe Marathon World Championships
World Championships
2018 in Portuguese sport
International sports competitions hosted by Portugal
Canoeing in Portugal
ICF